Reem Yusuf Masood Salem Al Hashmi (born 27 June 1987) is a Bahraini footballer who plays as a forward for the Bahrain national team. In 2014, she competed in the 2014 AFC Asian Cup qualification where she scored two goals against Kyrgyzstan.

Career statistics

International

References

1987 births
Living people
People from Muharraq
Bahraini women's footballers
Women's association football forwards
Bahrain women's international footballers